Psilocybe puberula is a species of mushroom in the family Hymenogastraceae. It contains the hallucinogenic drugs psilocybin and psilocin. It was described in 1996 from the Amersfort, Leusderheide, Netherlands, and is also known from Belgium. It is very rare.

See also
List of Psilocybin mushrooms
Psilocybin mushrooms
Psilocybe

References

Entheogens
Psychoactive fungi
puberula
Psychedelic tryptamine carriers
Fungi of North America